Pavel Aleksandrovich Valentenko (born 20 October 1987) is a Russian professional ice hockey defenceman. He currently plays with HC Yugra of the Supreme Hockey League (VHL).

Playing career
Valentenko was drafted in the fifth round, 139th overall, in the 2006 NHL Entry Draft by the Montreal Canadiens. He moved to North America in 2007 after growing up in the Nizhnekamsk hockey system to play for the Hamilton Bulldogs, the Canadiens' farm team. He was voted best rookie for the Bulldogs in his first season (2007–08) and was part of the group of players Montreal recalled for the 2008 NHL Playoffs in the case of injuries.

On 30 October 2008, it was reported that Valentenko had defected from the Hamilton Bulldogs and signed a three-year contract with Dynamo Moscow. This news came just days after Valentenko was given permission by the Bulldogs to go home to Russia for an indefinite period of time to deal with family issues.

On 30 June 2009, Valentenko was traded along with Chris Higgins, Doug Janik and Ryan McDonagh to the New York Rangers for Scott Gomez, Tom Pyatt and Michael Busto.

Between 2009 and 2012 he played for the Connecticut Whale of the American Hockey League. During the offseason in 2012 he signed with Avangard Omsk.

Career statistics

Regular season and playoffs

International

References

External links
 

1987 births
Living people
Avangard Omsk players
Connecticut Whale (AHL) players
HC Dynamo Moscow players
Hamilton Bulldogs (AHL) players
Hartford Wolf Pack players
Montreal Canadiens draft picks
HC Neftekhimik Nizhnekamsk players
Russian ice hockey defencemen
HC Spartak Moscow players
Torpedo Nizhny Novgorod players
HC Yugra players
Yuzhny Ural Orsk players